Skyview High School was a public charter high school in Tucson, Arizona. It was operated by The Leona Group.

The school was recommended for closure by The Leona Group effective June 30, 2014.

References 

Public high schools in Arizona
The Leona Group
Charter schools in Arizona
Schools in Pima County, Arizona
Former high schools in Arizona